Places called Bukit Tinggi (Malay and Indonesian for high hill) are:
 Bukittinggi, West Sumatra, Indonesia
 Bandar Bukit Tinggi, Klang, Selangor, Malaysia
 Bukit Tinggi, Pahang, Malaysia